Ignacio Uribe Etxebarria (born 27 December 1933) is a Spanish retired footballer who played as a forward.

Club career
Born in Bilbao, and the son of former Real Madrid and Athletic Bilbao player Luis María de Uribe (1906–1994), Uribe joined the latter in 1953, from Basque neighbours SD Indautxu. He made his La Liga debut on 20 September of that year, in 2–3 home loss against Real Madrid.

In the 1955–56 season, Uribe contributed with 30 games and nine goals to help the club win the sixth league championship in its history. During his ten-year stint at the San Mamés Stadium, he amassed overall totals of 211 matches and 69 goals, also conquering three Copa del Generalísimo trophies (scoring the only goal in the 1955 edition, against Sevilla CF); he retired at the age of 29.

Honours
La Liga: 1955–56
Copa del Generalísimo: 1955, 1956, 1958

References

External links

1933 births
Living people
Spanish footballers
Footballers from Bilbao
Association football forwards
La Liga players
Tercera División players
SD Indautxu footballers
Athletic Bilbao footballers
Spain B international footballers